Wyoming Highway 314 (WYO 314) is a  state highway in the southeastern part of Platte County, Wyoming, named Slater Road.

Route description 
Wyoming Highway 314 begins at its west end at I-25/US 87 (Exit 65) and travels east through Slater. The roadway continues east as Slater Road.

Major intersections

References
Official 2003 State Highway Map of Wyoming

External links

aaroads.com - Wyoming Routes 300-399
WYO 314 - I-25/US 87 to WYO 315
WYO 314 - WYO 315 to Slater Road

Transportation in Platte County, Wyoming
314